Steffen Kent Søberg (born August 6, 1993) is a Norwegian former professional ice hockey goaltender who played in the GET-ligaen for Vålerenga. He was selected by Washington Capitals in the 4th round (117th overall) of the 2011 NHL Entry Draft, becoming the first Norwegian goalie to ever get drafted by an NHL-team. Later that year he was selected 6th overall by the Swift Current Broncos in the 2011 CHL Import Draft.

Internationally he has played for the Norwegian national team in several World Championships, and was named to the roster for the 2014 Winter Olympics, though he did not play.

References

External links

1993 births
Living people
Norwegian ice hockey goaltenders
Ice hockey players at the 2014 Winter Olympics
Manglerud Star Ishockey players
Olympic ice hockey players of Norway
Ice hockey people from Oslo
Vålerenga Ishockey players
Washington Capitals draft picks
Norwegian expatriate ice hockey people
Norwegian expatriate sportspeople in the United States